Lawrence Eugene Haler (born January 24, 1951) is an American politician of the Republican Party. He was a member of the Washington House of Representatives, representing the 8th Legislative District. He was initially elected to fill the unexpired term of Jerome Delvin, who had resigned to take a seat in the state senate. Sean McGrath had held the seat in the interim. He was born in Iowa City, Iowa and previously served 14 years on the Richland City Council.
In February 2018, Haler announced that he would not seek re-election to the Washington State House of Representatives.

Awards 
 2014 Guardians of Small Business award. Presented by NFIB.

References

1951 births
Living people
Republican Party members of the Washington House of Representatives
21st-century American politicians